Lee Gary Trautsch (born 28 January 1971 in Sydney) is a retired male boxer from Australia. He represented his native country at the 1996 Summer Olympics in Atlanta, Georgia, where he was stopped in the first round of the men's light welterweight division (– 63.5 kg) by Tunisia's Fethi Missaoui.

He has since retired in south west Sydney with his beautiful partner where he runs a private farm.

References
 sports-reference

1971 births
Living people
Light-welterweight boxers
Boxers at the 1996 Summer Olympics
Olympic boxers of Australia
Commonwealth Games competitors for Australia
Boxers at the 1994 Commonwealth Games
Boxers from Sydney
Australian male boxers